The Revolutionary Communist Alliance (ACR) or Communist Alliance (AC) was a French political party founded in 1896 and dissolved in 1901.

The ACR was the name adopted by activists who left the Revolutionary Socialist Workers' Party (POSR) in 1896. In 1897, the ACR joined the Central Revolutionary Committee led by Édouard Vaillant, which became the Socialist Revolutionary Party (PSR). The PSR was the second largest Marxist party in France behind the French Workers' Party (POF) led by Jules Guesde. The ACR apparently operated semi-autonomously within the PSR before the ACR and PSR merged into the Socialist Party of France in 1902.

See also

History of the Left in France
Revolutionary Socialist Workers' Party
Socialist Revolutionary Party
Blanquism

Defunct political parties in France
Political parties of the French Third Republic
History of socialism
Communist parties in France
Second International
1896 establishments in France
Political parties established in 1896
1901 disestablishments in France
Political parties disestablished in 1901